Highway 212 is a highway in the Canadian province of Saskatchewan. It runs from Highway 11/Highway 783 near Duck Lake to the Fort Carlton Provincial Historic Park.

Highway 212 passes through Titanic. It also connects with Highway 683.

References

212